Sidney Willis was a British swimmer. He competed in the men's 100 metre backstroke event at the 1908 Summer Olympics.

References

Year of birth missing
Year of death missing
British male swimmers
Olympic swimmers of Great Britain
Swimmers at the 1908 Summer Olympics
Place of birth missing
British male backstroke swimmers